Kitchen (Kukhnya Serbian: Кухиња, Kuhinja) is a Russian comedy series that airs on STS. The show focuses on the comedic events that unfold in a fictional restaurant in Moscow called "Claude Monet". Since the 5th season, the comedic events unfold in the Hotel's restaurant.

Series overview 
The series is set in Moscow and mainly focuses on the young and enthusiastic Maxim "Max" Lavrov, who dreams of becoming a renowned chef one day, so after finishing culinary college in his home town of Voronezh and completing his army service, he goes to work at Moscow's most expensive restaurant - "Claude Monet", whose owner is Dmitry Nagiev, a famous Russian actor. He, as well as the entire staff of the restaurant "Claude Monet" often end up in humorous situations. The show includes other characters like Max's best friend Konstantin, his love interest (and later wife) Viktoria and his boss - the chef of the restaurant, Viktor Barinov.

Cast 
 Dmitry Nazarov as Viktor Petrovich Barinov, the chef of the restaurant "Claude Monet". Although he is a highly skilled but stern cook, he has a very nasty attitude and is generally rude to everyone, including Max. He is a huge fan of the football club Spartak Moscow. He has been divorced three times and has dated Elena Sokolova, the chef of the rival restaurant, from season 1 to 2. His eldest daughter Ekaterina began working as a cook in season 3. His beloved chefs knife is a Tojiro Flash series gyuto.
 Mark Bogatirev as Maxim "Max" Leonidovich Lavrov, the main character of the show. He is an enthusiastic young cook who came from Voronezh to Moscow in order to become a cook. In season 1 he started a relationship with Vika, the restaurant's art director but cheated on her after getting drunk and was in a relationship with Sasha, a waitress, in season 2 until Sasha cheated on him with her former boyfriend. At that end of season 3 he began dating Vika again and they married in the film "Kitchen in Paris".
 Yelena Podkaminskaya as Viktoria "Vika" Sergeevna Lavrova (née Goncharova), the art director of the restaurant, Max's girlfriend in season 1 and later his wife. Was in a brief relationship with Dmitry Nagiev in season 3, although the relationship was mostly one-sided on his side.
 Dmitry Nagiev as himself. He is a popular Russian actor and is the owner of the restaurant "Claude Monet". He was married to Kristina, a former promotional model at the restaurant. They divorced in season 3 and she stole the money from the restaurant, leaving it on the brink of bankruptcy and Nagiev sold it but later bought it back with the help of Rodion Sergeevich.
 Viktor Khorinyak as Konstantin "Kostya" Konstantinovich Anisimov, is a barman at the restaurant, Max's best friend, Nastya's husband as of season 3, and Stephan's father.
 Olga Kuzmina as Anastasia "Nastya" Stepanovna Anisimova (née Fomina), is a waitress at the restaurant, defender of animal's rights, Kostya's wife as of season 3, and Stephan's mother.
 Sergey Lavigin as Arseniy "Senya" Andreevich Chuganin, a cook who specializes in meat, often steals things from the kitchen. He is best friends with Fedya and often plays pranks on others with him.
 Mikhail Tarabukin as Fyodor "Fedya" Mikhailovich Yurchenko, a cook who specializes in fish. He is best friends with Senya and often plays pranks on others with him.
 Sergey Epishev as Lev "Lyova" Semyonovich Solovyov, the sous chef, Viktor Petrovich's right hand. He lives with his mother. He also has a stutter. He is in love with "Gulya" (niece of Aynura).
 Nikita Tarasov as Ludovic "Louis" Benoît, a confectioner from France. His character is gay.
 Ekaterina Kuznetsova as Alexandra "Sasha" Bubnova, a waitress and Max's girlfriend in season 2. She reconciles with her former boyfriend Ilya and as a result cheats on Max. In season 3 she gets fired because of Ilya trying to get Max fired but she takes the bait instead. At the end of the season it is revealed that she is pregnant and will be getting married.
 Valeriya Fedorovich as Ekaterina "Katya" Viktorovna Semyonova, Viktor Petrovich's eldest daughter and sous chef at the molecular kitchen. She has a crush on Max. She left the kitchen at the end of season 3 but is confirmed that she will return in season 4.
 Maria Gorban as Kristina Semyonovna Nagieva, Nagiev's ex-wife and briefly owner of the restaurant. She steals all of the money from the restaurant in season 3 and leaves it on the verge of bankruptcy.
 Marina Mogilevskaya as Elena Pavlovna Sokolova, the chef of the rival restaurant "Arcobaleno". She was in a relationship with Viktor Petrovich from season 2 to season 3.
 Andrey Burkovsky as Ilya, a former waiter at the restaurant and Sasha's ex-boyfriend. She cheated on Max with him which eventually Max discovered and he broke up with her. Ilya was fired in season 3.
 Janyl Asanbekova as Aynura Zhannatbekovna Kenensarova, a cleaner from Kyrgyzstan.
 Konstantin Chepurin as Rodion Sergeevich Gromov, a former homeless man who turned out to be a lost businessman in season 3. Enjoys reading and helped Nagiev buy back the restaurant in season 3.

Production 
The filming began in July 2012. The show became one of the most expensive TV series in Russia, with a budget of US$200,000 per episode (about $8 million per season). The first episode aired on STS Channel on October 22, 2012, at 21:00.

The second season began filming on November 1, 2012, and was aired on March 25, 2013.

In summer 2013, filming for the third season began. In September 2013, the production team filmed a feature-length film named The Kitchen in Paris. The movie premiered in cinemas on May 1, 2014, while the third season began airing on March 3, 2014, following the airing of a documentary film The Kitchen's Kitchen (A film about the film) on STS on March 2.

At the end of April 2014, filming for the fourth season began, and the first episode was aired on October 13, 2014.

From January 26 to April 30, 2015, season 5 was filmed. It premiered on September 7, 2015.

From June 25 through til October 15, 2015, season 6 was filmed. It was announced as the final season. It premiered on February 29, 2016.

The show officially finished all filming on October 15, 2015. Fans, knowing about the ending of the show, created a site in support of recommencing filming. On the site, more than 1 million signatures were collected by January 2016. The ending of the show was connected with the completion of the plot line for the main characters.

On May 27, 2004, work began on a new full-length film called The Kitchen: The Last Fight. In June 2015, official preparation for filming began. The filming took place from September 17, 2016, through till February 2017. It premiered in cinemas on April 20, 2017.

From July 4 to September 23, 2016, a spin-off show was filmed called Hotel Eleon. It premiered on STS on November 28, 2016. The Director, Anton Fedotov, also directed the final 3 seasons of The Kitchen. The new show also included some of the characters from The Kitchen (For example, Senya and Marina, Kostya and Nastya, Michail Jekovich, Eleonora Andreevna, Kristina, Nikita, as well as a number of secondary actors. Likewise, in the second season there are appearances from Louis Benoît, Ekaterina Semyonova, Rodion Sergeevich and Ainura Kenensarova).

Films and spin-offs 
 "The Kitchen in Paris" (2014) - first feature film
 "Hotel Eleon" (2016-2017) - sitcom, spin-off of the series The Kitchen
 "The Kitchen: Animated Series" (2016) - animated version of the first season
 "The Kitchen. The Last Battle" (2017) - second feature film
 "The Kitchen on departure" (2017) - two-part play, based on the series The Kitchen
 "Grand" (2018-2021) - sitcom, spin-off of the series The Kitchen and Hotel Eleon
 "#SenyaFedya" (2018-present) - sketch comedy, spin-off of the series The Kitchen and Hotel Eleon
 "The Kitchen. War for the Hotel" (2019-2020) - sitcom, spin-off of the series The Kitchen and Hotel Eleon
 "Hotel Belgrade" (2020) - third feature film, spin-off of the series Hotel Eleon and Grand

"Kitchenverse" 
 Chronology of events:
 "The Kitchen" - Season 1 (TV Series 2012-2016)
 "The Kitchen: Animated Series" - Season 1 (Animated TV Series 2016)
 "The Kitchen" - Seasons 2-3 (TV Series 2012-2016)
 "The Kitchen in Paris" (2014)
 "The Kitchen" - Seasons 4-5 (TV Series 2012-2016)
 "How I Became Russian" - Season 1 (TV Series 2015)
 "The Kitchen" - Season 6 (TV Series 2012-2016)
 "The Kitchen on departure" (two-part play 2017)
 "Hotel Eleon" - Season 1 (TV Series 2016-2017)
 "The Kitchen. The Last Battle" (2017)
 "Hotel Eleon" - Seasons 2-3 (TV Series 2016-2017)
 "Grand" - Season 1 (TV Series 2018-2021)
 "Grand" - Season 2 (TV Series 2018-2021)
 "#SenyaFedya" - Seasons 1-3 (TV Series 2018-present)
 "The Kitchen. War for the Hotel" - Season 1 (TV Series 2019-2020)
 "Hotel Belgrade" (2020)
 "Grand" - Season 3 (TV Series 2018-2021)
 "The Kitchen. War for the Hotel" - Season 2 (TV Series 2019-2020)
 "#SenyaFedya" - Season 4 (TV Series 2018-present)
 "Grand" - Seasons 4-5 (TV Series 2018-2021)
 "#SenyaFedya" - Season 5 (TV Series 2018-present)

Rating and adaptation of the series in other countries 
The show has been very successful in Russia and in other countries of the former Soviet Union. The show made the channel STS the number 1 channel in the "21:00-21:30", surpassing Channel 1, HTB, Russia-1 and other channels.
 
Adaptation of the series in other countries:

 Since 2016 the series has been shown with Serbian subtitles on the Serbian and Montenegrin channel Prva Srpska Televizija.
 Since 2015 the series has been shown with Mongolian voiceover on the Mongolian TV channel Edutainment TV.
 The Georgian adaptation of the series premiered in 2015 on GDS TV.
 In Greece, the adaptation titled Μάλιστα, σεφ! (Yes, boss!) was aired on Mega Channel.
 There was also an adaptation in Estonia around 2016.
 in Portugal, the adaptation series Sim, chef (Yes, boss) were aired on the channel RTP1.
 In the US, the first season of "Kitchen" can be ordered on Amazon under the name "The Kitchen" since 2015.
 Since 5 June 2017, the series is shown with Croatian subtitles on the Croatian channel RTL Televizija under the name Kuhinja ("Kitchen").
 In Slovenia, the adaptation series Ja, Chef! were aired in June 2021 on the streaming service Voyo (by Pro Plus).
 In Poland, the adaptation series Kuchnia were aired in polish TV Polsat in September 2021.
 In Hungary, the original aired with Hungarian voiceover under the title Igen, séf. A Hungarian version aired on March 19, 2022, as A Séf meg a többiek.

External links 
 Series page on the official website of the STS TV channel
 Series page on the official website of the Yellow, Black and White company

References 

STS (TV channel) original programming
Russian television sitcoms
2012 Russian television series debuts
2016 Russian television series endings
2010s Russian television series
Russian workplace comedy television series